Zealia Brown-Reed Bishop (1897–1968) was an American writer of short stories. Her name is sometimes spelled "Zelia". Although she mostly wrote romantic fiction, she is remembered for three short horror stories she wrote in collaboration with H. P. Lovecraft.

Works
Among her works are three horror stories she wrote in collaboration with H. P. Lovecraft ("The Curse of Yig", "Medusa's Coil", and The Mound). Her stories appeared in the magazine Weird Tales.

Arkham House published her volume The Curse of Yig (1953) which contains the three horror stories by Bishop and Lovecraft, as well as two profiles by Bishop, one about H. P. Lovecraft and the other about August Derleth. That on Lovecraft has been reprinted in Peter Cannon's collection of essays on Lovecraft, Lovecraft Remembered. The three Lovecraft-Bishop revision stories also appear in The Horror in the Museum and Other Revisions.

Bishop's preference was for romantic fiction, of which she wrote and published far more than she did of the weird. She lived in Kansas City with her husband D.W. Bishop, took an active role in the National Federation of Press Women, the New England Historic Genealogical Society and the Missouri Women's Press Club. She authored a historical series about Clay County, Missouri.

Letters from Lovecraft
In 2014, a hitherto unknown and unpublished cache of thirty-six letters from Lovecraft to Bishop was discovered. The letters had once been kept in a trunk with her manuscripts at the home of Jeanette Starkweather Cole, with whom Zealia had moved in after the death of her husband D.W. Bishop in 1956 (Clay County, Missouri), The trunk was initially bequeathed to their daughter, Etha Charmaine Cole McCall Fowler (Zealia's great niece). Her son, Sean McCall, found the letters following Mrs Fowler's death in 2014. A large manila envelope holding the letters was from Lovecraft's friend and collaborator, August Derleth, posted in August 1937. The envelope may have been used to return manuscripts of letters which Zealia had sent him following Lovecraft's death. The letters have now been published, with additional illustrative material, by the H. P. Lovecraft Historical Society.

References

External links

1897 births
1968 deaths
American fantasy writers
American horror writers
American women short story writers
Women science fiction and fantasy writers
Women horror writers
American women novelists
20th-century American novelists
20th-century American women writers
20th-century American short story writers